Bridlington Hospital is a health facility in Bessingby Road, Bridlington, East Riding of Yorkshire, England. It is managed by York and Scarborough Teaching Hospitals NHS Foundation Trust.

History
The hospital was commissioned to replace three former facilities: Lloyd Hospital in Quay Road, the Avenue Hospital in Westgate and the Bempton Lane Hospital. Built at a cost of £16 million, it opened to patients in March 1988. The official opening was conducted by the Duchess of Gloucester in May 1989. In February 2018 the local MP, Sir Greg Knight, expressed concern that the hospital was being under-utilized with three wards remaining empty.

References

External links

Hospitals established in 1989
1989 establishments in England
Hospital buildings completed in 1989
Hospitals in the East Riding of Yorkshire
NHS hospitals in England
Bridlington